Héctor Julio Ávila (born July 14, 1972 in Santiago de los Caballeros) is a retired boxer from the Dominican Republic.

Ávila competed for his native country at the 1992 Summer Olympics in Barcelona, Spain, where he was stopped in the quarterfinals of the Men's Flyweight (– 51 kg) division by Hungary's eventual bronze medalist István Kovács. He won a bronze medal at the 1990 Central American and Caribbean Games in Mexico City, Mexico.

References

sports-reference

1972 births
Living people
Flyweight boxers
Boxers at the 1992 Summer Olympics
Olympic boxers of the Dominican Republic
People from Santiago de los Caballeros
Dominican Republic male boxers
Central American and Caribbean Games bronze medalists for the Dominican Republic
Competitors at the 1990 Central American and Caribbean Games
Central American and Caribbean Games medalists in boxing
20th-century Dominican Republic people
21st-century Dominican Republic people